Comyops is a genus of bristle flies in the family Tachinidae.

Species
Comyops nigripennis Wulp, 1891
Comyops striaticollis Wulp, 1891

References

Dexiinae
Diptera of North America
Tachinidae genera
Taxa named by Frederik Maurits van der Wulp